Jordi Casas Gutiérrez (born 20 December 1976) is a former field hockey player from Spain, who finished in ninth position with the Men's National Team at the 2000 Summer Olympics in Sydney, Australia.

References
 Spanish Olympic Committee

External links

1976 births
Living people
Field hockey players from Catalonia
Spanish male field hockey players
Sportspeople from Terrassa
Olympic field hockey players of Spain
1998 Men's Hockey World Cup players
Field hockey players at the 2000 Summer Olympics
2002 Men's Hockey World Cup players
1990 Men's Hockey World Cup players